Stephen Newport (born 5 November 1965) is a former Australian rules footballer who played with Melbourne and St Kilda in the Australian Football League (AFL).

After missing out on a Grand Final appearance in 1987, when Gary Buckenara kicked a goal after the siren to win Hawthorn the Preliminary Final, but he got his chance the following season when he was a half back flanker in the premiership decider. He then had a particularly good year in 1989 when he managed 10 votes in the Brownlow Medal count, joining Jim Stynes as the club's leading vote getter for the season. In the same year he represented the VFL in an interstate match against Tasmania.

In the 1990 AFL draft, Newport was traded to St Kilda, in a deal which allowed Allen Jakovich to join Melbourne.

See also
 List of Caulfield Grammar School people

References

Holmesby, Russell and Main, Jim (2007). The Encyclopedia of AFL Footballers. 7th ed. Melbourne: Bas Publishing.

1965 births
Living people
Australian rules footballers from Victoria (Australia)
Melbourne Football Club players
St Kilda Football Club players
People educated at Caulfield Grammar School